The rupia was the currency of Portuguese India sometime after 1668 until 1958. Prior to 1668, the currency unit was Xerafim (xerafin, xeraphin). In 1666, the Portuguese administration struck a silver coin calling it double xerafin and this was declared equal to a rupia in circulation in India outside of Portuguese possessions. A xerafim was a convertible subunit of rupia, and it was unique to Portuguese colonies in India. One rupia equalled two xerafims.

In decades that followed, the double xerafin came to be known in Goa and other Portuguese Indian territories simply as rupia (or Portuguese Indian rupia) was subdivided into units such as reis (real) and pardao that mirrored the currency terms introduced by Portuguese officials in other colonies worldwide.

History
Before 1871, the rupia was subdivided into 750 bazarucos, 600 réis (singular: real), 20 pardaus or 10 tangas. A rupia equaled two xerafims. After 1871, 960 réis or 16 tangas (worth 60 réis) equalled 1 rupia. The rupia was equal in value to the Indian rupee. This meant the tanga was equal in value to the Indian anna. In 1958, the currency was replaced by the escudo at the rate of 1 rupia = 6 escudos.

Coins

Goa, Damão and Diu issued their own coinages until the middle of the 19th century. Damão issued copper 3, 15, 30 and 60 réis coins until 1854 when the mint closed. Diu issued lead and tin 5 and 10 bazarucos together with tin 20 bazarucos, copper 30 and 60 réis and silver 150 and 300 réis and 1 rupia. The Diu mint closed in 1859.

Goa issued the most diverse coinage of the three mints. The Goa mint was closed by the British in 1869.

Following the closure of the last local mint, coins were imported from Portugal beginning in 1871. This new coinage coincided with the reform of the subdivisions of the rupia. Copper coins were introduced in denominations of 3, 5, 10 and 15 réis,  and 1 tanga.

Banknotes

The first paper money issued specifically for Portuguese India was issued by the Junta da Fazenda Pública in 1882 in denominations of 10 and 20 rupias. These were followed in 1883 by notes issued by the General Government (Governo Geral) for 5, 10, 20, 50, 100 and 500 rupias.

In 1906, the Banco Nacional Ultramarino took over the issuance of paper money, issuing notes for 5, 10, 20 and 50 rupias. In 1917, notes were added for 4 and 8 tangas, 1 and  rupias. These were the only issue of tanga denominated notes, whilst the  rupia notes were issued until 1924 and the 1 rupia until 1929. 100 and 500 rupias notes were reintroduced in 1924.

References

External links

 Indo-Portuguese Issues

Modern obsolete currencies
Historical currencies of India
Portuguese India
Economic history of Portugal
1958 disestablishments in Portuguese India
19th-century establishments in Portuguese India